"Searchin'" is a song written by Jerry Leiber and Mike Stoller specifically for the Coasters. Atco Records released it as a single in March 1957, which topped the R&B Chart for twelve weeks. It also reached number three on the Billboard singles chart.

Although the Coasters had previously done well on the R&B charts, it was "Searchin'" (along with "Young Blood" on the flip side) that sparked the group's rock and roll fame.

Composition
The lyrics, written by Leiber, use vernacular phrasing. The plot revolves around the singer's determination to find his love wherever she may be, even if he must resort to detective work. The song's gimmick was to cite law-enforcement figures from popular culture such as Sherlock Holmes, Charlie Chan, Joe Friday, Sam Spade, Boston Blackie, Bulldog Drummond, and the North-West Mounted Police (the Mounties). The vocals of the Coasters' lead singer Billy Guy are raw and insistent. Driving the song is a pounding piano rhythm of two bass notes alternating on every second beat.
 
The theme of the song is searching for love: "Well, I'm searching,
Yeah I'm gonna find her". The refrain is simple variations of this phrase, "Gonna find her, yeah ah, gonna find her".

Personnel
The song was recorded in Los Angeles on February 15, 1957.

 Mike Stoller, piano
 Gil Bernal, saxophone
 Barney Kessel, guitar/mandolin
 Adolph Jacobs, guitar
 Ralph Hamilton, bass
 Jesse Sailes, drums
 A.L. “Abe” Stoller, drums
 Joe Oliveria, congas

Other versions
Johnny Rivers released a version of the song as a medley with "So Fine" which reached number 113 on the U.S. pop chart in 1973.

Singer/songwriter Paul McCartney chose "Searchin'" as one of his Desert Island Discs in 1982. McCartney performed the song with the Beatles during their audition for Decca Records on January 1, 1962 (with somewhat mangled lyrics that included a mention of Peter Gunn).

The Song was performed by Floyd Pepper in an episode of The Muppet Show

References

Songs written by Jerry Leiber and Mike Stoller
1957 singles
The Coasters songs
The Beatles songs
The Hollies songs
The Spencer Davis Group songs
Atco Records singles
The Crickets songs